Hawthorne Township is located in White County, Illinois. As of the 2010 census, its population was 275 and it contained 141 housing units.

Notable residents
Frank McElyea, MLB outfielder for the Boston Brakes

Geography

Demographics

References

External links
City-data.com
Illinois State Archives

Townships in White County, Illinois
Townships in Illinois
1871 establishments in Illinois